Tyler Rudy (born September 29, 1993) is a retired American soccer player who played for the New England Revolution and Puerto Rico FC.

Career

College and Amateur
Rudy played four years of college soccer at Georgetown University between 2011 and 2014.

He had seven goals and 12 assists in 88 appearances for the Hoyas while helping them reach the College Cup Final in 2012. Rudy served as a captain for Georgetown as a senior in 2014, earning Second Team All-BIG EAST honors while also being named a BIG EAST All-Academic selection. While still in college, Rudy played for the Pittsburgh Riverhounds U23 of the Premier Development League for the 2014 season. He appeared in six matches for the club, tallying one assist.

Professional
Rudy signed with MLS side New England Revolution on February 28, 2015. He was loaned to New England's United Soccer League affiliate Rochester Rhinos on April 3, 2015. He appeared in 14 games for the Rochester Rhinos, as they went on to win the 2015 United Soccer League Championship.

On March 30, 2016, Rudy signed with NASL expansion side Puerto Rico FC. He announced his retirement from the game on June 30, 2017.

References

External links
 
 Revolution bio

1993 births
Living people
American soccer players
Georgetown Hoyas men's soccer players
Pittsburgh Riverhounds U23 players
New England Revolution players
Rochester New York FC players
Puerto Rico FC players
Association football midfielders
Soccer players from Maryland
USL League Two players
USL Championship players
North American Soccer League players